The Alberta Centennial Medal is a commemorative medal celebrating Alberta's first 100 years of participating in Canadian Confederation.

History
In 2005, the Alberta Centennial Medal Act established the Alberta Centennial Medal.

Purpose
The Alberta Centennial Medal Act established a process to award medals to outstanding Albertans who have made a significant contribution to society and to honour their contributions.

Eligibility

Eligibility for the medal was restricted to living men, women and youth who made significant contributions to their fellow citizens, their community and to Alberta, and were Canadian citizens that had resided in Alberta.

Approximately 8,000 medals were awarded to outstanding Albertans. Representatives from provincial organizations, governments and other groups were asked to make the nominations. Only nominations submitted by these nominating partners were accepted.

The following individuals received the Alberta Centennial Medal:

Design
The medal's simple design features Alberta's coat of arms and the words "Alberta Centennial 1905–2005" on the front and shield of the arms and "Honouring Outstanding Albertans" on the back. It is cast in bronze and plated in gold.

The colours of the medal's ribbon symbolize Alberta's spirit and strengths. Blue and gold, Alberta's provincial colours are most prominent in the ribbon. All the colours in the ribbon are taken from Alberta's official emblems and heraldry. They are :

Blue: clear skies and sparkling lakes
Gold: wheat fields and resource wealth
Green: forests
White: mountains
Pink: wild rose

The Alberta Centennial Medal is included in the Canadian order of precedence of decorations and medals and may be mounted and worn with other official honours.

See also
List of Canadian awards
Orders, decorations, and medals of the Canadian provinces

References

Further reading

External links
Alberta Centennial: Centennial Medal
List of recipients
Alberta Centennial Medal presentation - Defence Medals Canada
Alberta centennial medal presentation - Governor General of Canada
Legislative Assembly of Alberta - Alberta Centennial Medal

Provincial and territorial orders of Canada
Alberta awards
2005 in Alberta